This is a list of award winners and single-season leaderboards for the Boston Red Sox professional baseball team.

Abbreviations
   p: pitcher
 rp: relief pitcher
 sp: starting pitcher
   c: catcher
 1b: first baseman
 2b: second baseman
 3b: third baseman
 ss: shortstop
 lf: left fielder
 cf: center fielder
 rf: right fielder
 if: infielder
 of: outfielder
 dh: designated hitter

Awards

MVP Award

1912: Tris Speaker
1938: Jimmie Foxx
1946: Ted Williams
1949: Ted Williams
1958: Jackie Jensen
1967: Carl Yastrzemski
1975: Fred Lynn
1978: Jim Rice
1986: Roger Clemens
1995: Mo Vaughn
2008: Dustin Pedroia
2018: Mookie Betts

Cy Young Award

1967: Jim Lonborg
1986: Roger Clemens
1987: Roger Clemens
1991: Roger Clemens
1999: Pedro Martínez
2000: Pedro Martínez
2016: Rick Porcello

Rookie of the Year Award

1950: Walt Dropo
1961: Don Schwall
1972: Carlton Fisk
1975: Fred Lynn
1997: Nomar Garciaparra
2007: Dustin Pedroia

Manager of the Year Award

 1986: John McNamara
 1999: Jimy Williams

Silver Slugger Award
25 different Red Sox players have received Silver Slugger Awards since its inception in 1981. Wade Boggs (3B) and David Ortiz (DH) have the most wins at their respective positions, the only American League players to currently to hold this distinction. Additionally, the 9 wins for Manny Ramirez are the most of any American League outfielder. In 2018 J.D. Martinez was awarded the Silver Slugger for the DH and OF positions, making him the only player to win the award twice in a single season.

Gold Glove Award
23 different Red Sox players have won Gold Glove Awards since the award was begun in 1957. Dwight Evans with eight Gold Gloves is the all-time Red Sox leader, while Carl Yastrzemski is second with seven. Only three outfielders have won more Gold Gloves than Evans: Willie Mays (12), Roberto Clemente (12) and Al Kaline (10).

 Ian Kinsler played the first half of the 2018 season with the Los Angeles Angels.

Wilson Defensive Player of the Year Award
The Wilson Defensive Player of the Year Award was established in 2012. It was awarded to one player on each MLB team in 2012 and 2013; since 2014, one MLB player at each position has been honored. An overall Defensive Player of the Year has been selected each year; one player per league in 2012 and 2013, and a single MLB player starting in 2014.

 2012: Dustin Pedroia
 2013: Dustin Pedroia
 2016: Dustin Pedroia (2B), Mookie Betts (OF)
 2018: Mookie Betts (OF)

Overall winner
 2013: Dustin Pedroia (AL)
 2016: Mookie Betts (MLB)

Hank Aaron Award
The Hank Aaron Award, introduced in 1999, is given annually to the MLB players selected as the top hitter in each league, as voted on by baseball fans and members of the media.

 2004: Manny Ramirez
 2005: David Ortiz
 2008: Kevin Youkilis
 2016: David Ortiz
 2018: J. D. Martinez

Reliever of the Year Award
Formerly the Delivery Man Award (2005–2013), awarded to one MLB reliever; the Reliever of the Year Award has been issued since 2014, to a reliever in each league.
 2007: Jonathan Papelbon (MLB)
 2017: Craig Kimbrel (AL)

Relief Man of the Year Award

Awarded from 1976 to 2012
1977: Bill Campbell
1998: Tom Gordon

Comeback Player of the Year Award

Awarded in each league, since 2005
2011: Jacoby Ellsbury
2016: Rick Porcello

Edgar Martínez Award
The Edgar Martínez Award has been presented annually to the most outstanding designated hitter in the American League since 1973.
 1973: Orlando Cepeda
 1975: Jim Rice
 1986: Don Baylor
 2003: David Ortiz
 2004: David Ortiz
 2005: David Ortiz
 2006: David Ortiz
 2007: David Ortiz
 2011: David Ortiz
 2013: David Ortiz
 2016: David Ortiz

Roberto Clemente Award
The Roberto Clemente Award has been awarded since 1971, to the MLB player who "best exemplifies the game of baseball, sportsmanship, community involvement and the individual's contribution to his team."
 2010: Tim Wakefield
 2011: David Ortiz

DHL Hometown Heroes

 Ted Williams — voted by MLB fans in 2006 as the most outstanding player in the history of the franchise, based on on-field performance, leadership quality and character value

MLB All-Century Team
In 1999, the Major League Baseball All-Century Team was chosen by popular vote of fans.
 Cy Young (p)
 Roger Clemens (p)
 Lefty Grove (p)
 Babe Ruth (p)
 Ted Williams (of)

MLB All-Time Team
The Major League Baseball All-Time Team was chosen in 1997, by 36 members of the Baseball Writers' Association of America, to comprise the top manager and top player in each of 13 positional categories across MLB history.
First Team
 Ted Williams (lf)

Runners Up
 Jimmie Foxx (1b)
 Dennis Eckersley (rp)
 Joe McCarthy (manager)

Note: Babe Ruth was voted first team right fielder, but because he never played that position with Boston, he is not listed here.

Sporting News All-Decade Team (2009)
See Sporting News#Major-league baseball awards
 Team of the Decade: Boston Red Sox
 Manny Ramirez (of)
 David Ortiz (dh)
 Executive of the Decade: Theo Epstein (Red Sox GM)

Sports Illustrated MLB All-Decade Team
See List of 2009 all-decade Sports Illustrated awards and honors#MLB All-Decade Team
David Ortiz, designated hitter (2009) (Twins–Red Sox)

Best MLB Player ESPY Award
The Best Major League Baseball Player ESPY Award has been awarded annually since 1993.
2000: Pedro Martínez
2001: Pedro Martínez

Topps All-Star Rookie teams
Awarded by Topps since 1959; awards appear on the following year's baseball card release.

 1959: Pumpsie Green (2b)
 1961: Don Schwall (p)
 1964: Tony Conigliaro (of)
 1965: Rico Petrocelli (ss)
 1966: George Scott (1b)
 1967: Reggie Smith (of)
 1969: Mike Nagy (p)
 1970: Billy Conigliaro (of)
 1971: Doug Griffin (2b)
 1972: Carlton Fisk (c)
 1975: Fred Lynn (of) and Jim Rice (of)
 1980: Glenn Hoffman (3b)
 1984: Jackie Gutiérrez (ss)
 1987: Ellis Burks (of) and Mike Greenwell (of)
 1997: Scott Hatteberg (c) and Nomar Garciaparra (ss)
 1999: Brian Daubach (1b)
 2007: Dustin Pedroia (2b) and Hideki Okajima (p)
 2011: Josh Reddick (of)
 2013: José Iglesias (ss)
 2014: Xander Bogaerts (ss)
 2017: Rafael Devers (3b) and Andrew Benintendi (of)

Fielding Bible Award

Awarded since 2006
 2011: Dustin Pedroia (2b)
 2013: Dustin Pedroia (2b)
 2014: Dustin Pedroia (2b)
 2016: Dustin Pedroia (2b), Mookie Betts (of)
 2017: Mookie Betts (of)
 2018: Mookie Betts (of)

Babe Ruth Award
The Babe Ruth Award is given annually to the MLB player with the best performance in the postseason, awarded since 1949 by the New York City chapter of the Baseball Writers' Association of America (BBWAA).
2004: Keith Foulke
2007: Jonathan Papelbon
2013: David Ortiz
2018: David Price

Baseball America Manager of the Year
See: Baseball America#Major League Baseball awards
Awarded since 1998
 1999: Jimy Williams
 2007: Terry Francona

Sporting News Manager of the Year Award
The Sporting News Manager of the Year Award was established in 1936 by The Sporting News and was given annually to one manager in MLB. In 1986, it was expanded to honor one manager from each league.
1967: Dick Williams
1975: Darrell Johnson
1986: John McNamara
1999: Jimy Williams
2013: John Farrell

Associated Press Manager of the Year Award
Awarded by the Associated Press to a manager in each league from 1959 through 1983; awarded to one manager in MLB from 1984 through 2000; discontinued in 2001.
 1967: Dick Williams
 1975: Darrell Johnson

Sporting News Executive of the Decade (2009)
See Sporting News#Major-league baseball awards
Theo Epstein

Sports Illustrated Best General Manager of the Decade (2009)
See List of 2009 all-decade Sports Illustrated awards and honors#Major League Baseball
Theo Epstein

Baseball America Major League Executive of the Year
See Baseball America#Major League Baseball
: Theo Epstein

Triple Crown Champions

Batting
1942: Ted Williams (.356, 36, 137)
1947: Ted Williams (.343, 32, 114)
1967: Carl Yastrzemski (.326, 44, 121)

Pitching
1901: Cy Young (33, 158, 1.62)
1999: Pedro Martínez (23, 313, 2.07)

Post-Season and All-Star Game MVP Award Winners
World Series MVP
2004: Manny Ramírez
2007: Mike Lowell
2013: David Ortiz
2018: Steve Pearce
Lee MacPhail MVP Award (ALCS)1986: Marty Barrett
2004: David Ortiz
2007: Josh Beckett
2013: Koji Uehara
2018: Jackie Bradley Jr.
All-Star Game MVPNote This was re-named the Ted Williams Most Valuable Player Award in 2002.1970: Carl Yastrzemski
1986: Roger Clemens
1999: Pedro Martínez
2008: J. D. Drew

Team award

 – William Harridge Trophy (American League champion)
1976 – Babe Ruth League Hall of Fame
 – William Harridge Trophy (American League champion)
2004 – William Harridge Trophy (American League champion)
 – Commissioner's Trophy (World Series)
2004 – Sports Illustrated Sportsman of the Year
2005 (2004 Boston Red Sox) – Outstanding Team ESPY Award
2005 – Laureus World Sports Awards (Spirit of Sport Award)
2007 – William Harridge Trophy (American League champion)
 – Commissioner's Trophy (World Series)
 – Sporting News Team of the Decade
2010 – Commissioner's Award for Philanthropic Excellence
2013 – William Harridge Trophy (American League champion)
 – Commissioner's Trophy (World Series)
2013 – Philadelphia Sports Writers Association Team of the Year

Team captains
Doc Gessler (1909)
Harry Hooper (1918–1920)
Everett Scott (1921)
Carl Yastrzemski (1966,1969–83)
Jim Rice (1985–89)
Jason Varitek (2005–2011)

Team records (single-season and career)

Other achievements

Baseball Hall of FamersSee: .Boston Red Sox Hall of Fame

Ford C. Frick Award recipientsSee: .Retired numbersSee: .World Baseball Classic All–WBC Team
 – Daisuke Matsuzaka (P)

Associated Press Athlete of the Year

1957 — Ted Williams
1967 — Carl Yastrzemski
1975 — Fred Lynn

Hickok BeltNote: The Hickok Belt trophy was awarded to the top professional athlete of the year in the U.S., from 1950 to 1976.Sports Illustrated Sportsman of the YearSee navigation box below and Sportsman of the YearSports Illustrated Top 10 Coaches/Managers of the Decade (2009)See: .No. 4 – Terry Francona (the list's only other MLB manager was the New York Yankees and Los Angeles Dodgers' Joe Torre, No. 3)

Sports Illustrated Top 10 GMs/Executives of the Decade (2009)See: .''
No. 3 – Theo Epstein (the list's only other MLB GMs were Seattle and Philadelphia's Pat Gillick, No. 7, and Oakland's Billy Beane, No. 10)

United States Sports Academy "Carl Maddox Sport Management Award"

2007 – Theo Epstein

Single-Season leaders

Hitters
Batting Champions

1938: Jimmie Foxx (.349)
1941: Ted Williams (.406)
1942: Ted Williams (.356)
1947: Ted Williams (.343)
1948: Ted Williams (.369)
1950: Billy Goodman (.354)
1957: Ted Williams (.388)
1958: Ted Williams (.328)
1960: Pete Runnels (.320)
1962: Pete Runnels (.326)
1963: Carl Yastrzemski (.321)
1967: Carl Yastrzemski (.326)
1968: Carl Yastrzemski (.301)
1979: Fred Lynn (.333)
1981: Carney Lansford (.336)
1983: Wade Boggs (.361)
1985: Wade Boggs (.368)
1986: Wade Boggs (.357)
1987: Wade Boggs (.363)
1988: Wade Boggs (.366)
1999: Nomar Garciaparra (.357)
2000: Nomar Garciaparra (.372)
2002: Manny Ramírez (.349)
2003: Bill Mueller (.326)
2018: Mookie Betts (.346)

Home Run Champions
1910: Jake Stahl (10)
1918: Babe Ruth (11)
1919: Babe Ruth (29)
1939: Jimmie Foxx (35)
1941: Ted Williams (37)
1942: Ted Williams (36)
1947: Ted Williams (32)
1949: Ted Williams (43)
1965: Tony Conigliaro (32)
1967: Carl Yastrzemski (44)
1977: Jim Rice (39)
1978: Jim Rice (46)
1981: Dwight Evans (22)
1983: Jim Rice (39)
1984: Tony Armas (43)
2004: Manny Ramírez (43)
2006: David Ortiz (54)
RBI Champions
1902: Buck Freeman (121)
1903: Buck Freeman (104)
1919: Babe Ruth (114)
1938: Jimmie Foxx (175)
1939: Ted Williams (145)
1942: Ted Williams (137)
1947: Ted Williams (114)
1949: Vern Stephens and Ted Williams (159)
1950: Walt Dropo and Vern Stephens (144)
1955: Jackie Jensen: (116)
1958: Jackie Jensen (122)
1959: Jackie Jensen (112)
1963: Dick Stuart (118)
1967: Carl Yastrzemski  (121)
1968: Ken Harrelson (109)
1978: Jim Rice (139)
1983: Jim Rice (126)
1984: Tony Armas (123)
1995: Mo Vaughn (126)
2005: David Ortiz (148)
2006: David Ortiz (137)
2016: David Ortiz (127)
2018: J.D. Martinez (130)

Pitchers
Winning Games leaders
1901: Cy Young (33)
1902: Cy Young (32)
1903: Cy Young (28)
1912: Smoky Joe Wood (34)
1935: Wes Ferrell (25)
1942: Tex Hughson (22)
1955: Frank Sullivan (18)
1967: Jim Lonborg (22)
1986: Roger Clemens (24)
1987: Roger Clemens (20)
1999: Pedro Martínez (23)
2004: Curt Schilling (21)
2007: Josh Beckett (20)
2016: Rick Porcello (22)
Strikeouts leaders
1901: Cy Young (158)
1942: Tex Hughson (113)
1967: Jim Lonborg (246)
1988: Roger Clemens (291)
1991: Roger Clemens (241)
1996: Roger Clemens (257)
1999: Pedro Martínez (313)
2000: Pedro Martínez (284)
2001: Hideo Nomo (220)
2002: Pedro Martínez (239)
2017: Chris Sale (308)
ERA leaders
1901: Cy Young (1.62)
1914: Dutch Leonard (0.96)
1915: Smoky Joe Wood (1.49)
1916: Babe Ruth (1.75)
1935: Lefty Grove (2.70)
1936: Lefty Grove (2.81)
1938: Lefty Grove (3.08)
1939: Lefty Grove (2.54)
1949: Mel Parnell (2.78)
1972: Luis Tiant (1.91)
1986: Roger Clemens (2.48)
1990: Roger Clemens (1.93)
1991: Roger Clemens (2.62)
1992: Roger Clemens (2.41)
1999: Pedro Martínez (2.07)
2000: Pedro Martínez (1.74)
2002: Pedro Martínez (2.26)
2003: Pedro Martínez (2.22)

See also
Ted Williams Most Valuable Player Award (All-Star Game)
Tony Conigliaro Award
Baseball awards
List of MLB awards

References

Boston
Awards